"Right Type of Mood" is a song by English producer Herbie. It is produced by Denniz PoP and Max Martin, and was released in March 1995 as the lead single from his debut album, Fingers. It received various successes globally on both the commercial Pop and R&B charts and was supported by a partially computer generated music video. The single reached number 3 in Sweden and number-one on the Canadian dance music chart. In addition, it peaked within the top 20 in Denmark and Finland. On the Eurochart Hot 100, it peaked at number 48 in March 1995. The song is a collaboration of synthetic drums and pads layered over striving constant and uplifting stabs and atmospheric arrangements. "Right Type of Mood" was also nominated to the Swedish Dance Music Awards in 1996 for Best Swedish Dance Track.

Critical reception
James Hamilton from British magazine Music Week'''s RM'' Dance Update described "Right Type of Mood" as a "Herbie Chrichlow ragga rapped catchy 'Mister Magoo' shouting jaunty Swedish galloper".

Music video
The music video for "Right Type of Mood" was directed by Matt Broadley and is filmed in a metro train.

Charts

Weekly charts

Year-end charts

Certifications

References 

1995 singles
1995 songs
Eurodance songs
Songs written by Herbie Crichlow
Songs written by Max Martin
Song recordings produced by Denniz Pop
Song recordings produced by Max Martin
Black-and-white music videos
Music videos directed by Matt Broadley